Eikesdal Church is a parish church of the Church of Norway in Molde Municipality in Møre og Romsdal county, Norway. It is located in the village of Eikesdalen. It is the church for the Eikesdal parish which is part of the Molde domprosti (arch-deanery) in the Diocese of Møre. The white, wooden church was built in a long church style in 1866 using plans by the architect Jacob Wilhelm Nordan. The church seats about 100 people.

History
In 1862, the people of the Eikesdalen valley formally requested permission to build a chapel. The municipality council approved the request in 1864 and a royal decree on 31 December 1865, finally gave official approval for the new chapel. The chapel was designed by Jacob Wilhelm Nordan (the exact same plans as Stordalen Chapel in Meråker). Construction began in April 1866, and the work lasted a few months. The new chapel was consecrated on 3 October 1866.

Media gallery

See also
List of churches in Møre

References

Buildings and structures in Molde
Churches in Møre og Romsdal
Long churches in Norway
Wooden churches in Norway
19th-century Church of Norway church buildings
Churches completed in 1866
1866 establishments in Norway